Me is a studio album by the British-American experimental rock group the Mekons, released on May 19, 1998 on Quarterstick Records. It is noted for featuring greater use of electronic musical instruments than their previous work.

Critical reception

In the Grand Rapids Press, Tim Pratt described Me as "a popcorn ball of chewy, sticky fun, combining subtly subversive lyrics with crunchy elements of rock, punk and electronic music and then mashed together in an oddball, yet tasty, musical treat." The Chicago Tribunes Rick Reger also reviewed the album favorably, writing that "Far from being a bizarre change of direction, "Me" ably upholds the Mekons' tradition of thwarting expectation and flouting convention." A review of the album in the Orlando Weekly stated that "There is something for everyone here. The fleeting string sections, noisy guitars, cheesy Stereolab-style keyboards, accordions and fiddles keep "Me" unpredictable and will leave you wondering what's next for these evolving musical chameleons."

Track listing
"Enter the Lists" - 4:08
"Down" - 4:16
"Narrative" - 4:18
"Tourettes" - 3:19
"Flip Flop" - 4:30
"Gin & It" - 4:24
"Back to Back" - 3:49
"Come and Have a Go If You Think You're Hard Enough" - 3:15
"Men United" - 3:23
"Mirror" - 4:32
"Far Sub Dominant" - 6:43
"Whiskey Sex Shack" - 3:02
"Thunder" - 5:34
"Belly to Belly" - 8:41

Personnel
Rico Bell – accordion, vocals  
Rebecca Gates – backing vocals 
Sarah Corina - bass
Steve Goulding - drums
Susie Honeyman - fiddle
Jon Langford, Tom Greenhalgh - guitar, vocals 
Ken Sluiter, The Mekons - recording and mastering
Lu Edmonds - saz
Sally Timms - vocals

References

The Mekons albums
1998 albums
Quarterstick Records albums